GBG  may refer to:

Transportation 
 Galesburg Municipal Airport, in Illinois, United States
 Gorebridge railway station, in Scotland
 Gramsbergen railway station, in the Netherlands

Other uses 
 Gbanzili language
 G beta-gamma complex
 GB Group (UK), a UK public company focused on identity verification, location intelligence and fraud detection
 Georgeson Botanical Garden, in Fairbanks, Alaska, United States
 God Bless Guyana, a defunct political party in Guyana
 Good Beer Guide
 Good Behavior Game, a classroom behavior management strategy
 Google Business Groups
 Gothenburg, Sweden
 Green bean galaxy
 Guernsey, Channel Islands
 Star Wars: Galactic Battlegrounds, a computer game